James Henderson "Monk" Moscrip (September 17, 1913 – October 11, 1980) was an American college and professional football player.

Born in Adena, Ohio, he attended The Kiski Prep School in Saltsburg, Pennsylvania, before enrolling at Stanford University in Palo Alto, California.  Moscrip became an All-American end for the Stanford Indians and was a member of the Stanford football teams known as the "Vow Boys."  The "Vow Boys" teams played together from 1934 to 1936, never lost a game to either USC or Cal, and went to three consecutive Rose Bowl games.  Moscrip was selected as a consensus first-team All-American in both 1934 and 1935.

Moscrip was drafted in the ninth round of the 1936 NFL Draft. He played professional football with the Detroit Lions in 1938 and 1939. He served as a lieutenant in the U.S. Navy during World War II and participated in battles at Guadalcanal, Iwo Jima, and Okinawa.  After winning a fight against alcohol addiction, Moscrip served as the manager of the alcohol rehabilitation center in Woodside, California for nearly 25 years.  In October 1980, Moscrip died of a heart attack at his home in Atherton, California, at the age of 67.  He was survived by his wife and two daughters.

See also
 1934 College Football All-America Team
 1935 College Football All-America Team

References

1913 births
1980 deaths
All-American college football players
American football ends
Stanford Cardinal football players
Detroit Lions players
College Football Hall of Fame inductees
United States Navy personnel of World War II
People from Atherton, California
People from Adena, Ohio
The Kiski School alumni
United States Navy officers
Military personnel from California